Tappeh-ye Hoseyn Khan (also Romanized as Tappeh-ye Ḩoseyn Khān) is a village in Sanjabi Rural District, Kuzaran District, Kermanshah County, Kermanshah Province, Iran. At the 2006 census, its population was 123, in 29 families.

References 

Populated places in Kermanshah County